Naso elegans is a tropical fish found in coral reefs in the Indian Ocean. It is commonly known as the elegant unicornfish, Indian orange-spine unicorn, orange-spine unicorn, and smoothheaded unicornfish.

References

External links
 

Naso (fish)
Fish described in 1829